Hatia railway station, station code HTE, is the railway station serving the capital city of Ranchi in the Ranchi district in the Indian state of Jharkhand. Hatia Station belongs to the Ranchi division of the South Eastern Railway Zone of the Indian Railways. Hatia railway station is connected to most of the major cities in India by the railway network. It is situated on Ranchi–Rourkela railway section.

Ranchi has trains running frequently to Delhi and Kolkata. Many important trains start from Ranchi Junction as well.

Facilities 
The major facilities available are waiting rooms, retiring room, computerised reservation facility, reservation counter, vehicle parking, etc. The vehicles are allowed to enter the station premises. There are refreshment rooms vegetarian and non vegetarian, tea stall, book stall, post and telegraphic office. Security personnel from the Government Railway police (G.R.P) and Railway Protection Force (RPF) are present for security. The Railway medical unit providing health facilities is located near Hatia Station. Hatia Station is located close to the bus terminal and domestic airport providing transport to important destinations of Jharkhand.

Platforms 
The three platforms are interconnected with foot overbridges (FOB).

Trains 
Hatia is a major railway station in Ranchi division of the South Eastern Railway and a terminal station for several trains. Several electrified as well as diesel local, M/E, SF, GR passenger trains also run from Hatia / Ranchi to different destinations of the country on frequent intervals.

Many passenger and express trains serve Hatia Station.

Nearest airports 
The nearest airports to Hatia Station are:

Birsa Munda Airport, Ranchi 
Gaya Airport, Gaya 
Lok Nayak Jayaprakash Airport, Patna 
Netaji Subhash Chandra Bose International Airport, Kolkata

References

External links 

 Hatia Station Map
 Official website of the Ranchi district

Railway stations in Ranchi district
Transport in Ranchi
Buildings and structures in Ranchi
Ranchi railway division